Markeaton Park is a large public park located in Markeaton, Derby, 207 acres in size. It attracts one million visitors a year, making it one of the most visited parks in the East Midlands. Markeaton Park is an important part of Derby history, which was sold to the Mundy family in 1516. The Mundy family gave Markeaton Park to Derby City Council in the early 20th century, who now provide facilities and events throughout the year.

Markeaton Park is a popular destination for walking, cycling and taking picnics. The park has a pitch and putt course, rowing boats, fishing and tennis courts plus the refurbished Grade II listed Orangery Cafe and Craft Village. Children's activities include playgrounds, Skyline High Ropes, paddling pool, donkey rides, a light railway and crazy golf.

Behind the modern day park lays a history which can be traced back to the medieval period, when the first park was laid out. Over the following centuries the park went through many changes, from arable fields to an enclosed designed 18th century park and hall, and finally at the beginning of the 20th century into the public park of today. The park has many features that mark this history: ancient veteran trees, historic lost roads, old arable field patterns, the 18th century park and buildings and the remains of a Second World War army camp.

Markeaton Brook flows through the park.

Markeaton parkrun, a free weekly timed 5k run, takes place in the park every Saturday morning at 9.00am, having moved from its previous location at Darley. The park also annually hosts a triathlon organised by the Jenson Button Trust, as well as other athletic events throughout the year such as the Race for Life and the Resolution Run.

There is a Friends of Markeaton Park group who are a registered charity to provide educational activities, events and manage Markeaton Park's walled garden.

References

Parks and commons in Derby
Urban public parks in the United Kingdom